Dochmiocera is a genus of flies in the family Stratiomyidae.

Distribution
Australia.

Species
Dochmiocera aurilineata Hardy, 1922

References

Stratiomyidae
Brachycera genera
Diptera of Australasia
Endemic fauna of Australia